In 2014, NASCAR sanctioned three national series, and five touring series.

National series
2014 NASCAR Sprint Cup Series – The top racing series in NASCAR
2014 NASCAR Nationwide Series – The second highest racing series in NASCAR
2014 NASCAR Camping World Truck Series – The third highest racing series in NASCAR

Touring series
2014 NASCAR K&N Pro Series West – One of the two K&N Pro Series
2014 NASCAR K&N Pro Series East – One of the two K&N Pro Series
2014 NASCAR Whelen Modified Tour – One of the two modified tours in NASCAR
2014 NASCAR Whelen Southern Modified Tour – One of the two modified tours in NASCAR
2014 NASCAR Canadian Tire Series season – The top NASCAR racing series in Canada
2014 NASCAR Toyota Series season – The top NASCAR racing series in Mexico
2014 NASCAR Whelen Euro Series season – The top NASCAR racing series in Europe

 
NASCAR seasons